The Union for Democracy and Social Progress was a political party in Burkina Faso.

In the 2007 parliamentary elections the party won one of the 111 seats in the National Assembly.

Defunct political parties in Burkina Faso